Odegbami is a Yoruba surname. Notable people with the surname include:

Segun Odegbami (born 1952), Nigerian footballer
Wole Odegbami (born 1962), Nigerian footballer

Yoruba-language surnames